The 2004 California wildfires were a series of wildfires that were active in the state of California during the year 2004. In total, 7,898 fires burned .

Fires 
Below is a list of all fires that exceeded  during the 2004 fire season. The list is taken from CAL FIRE's list of large fires.

References

 
Wildfires 2004
California, 2004
2004